Marozzo is an Italian surname. Notable people with the surname include:

Achille Marozzo (1484–1553), Italian fencing master
Nicola Marozzo (born 1965), Italian racing driver

See also
Marozzi

Italian-language surnames